Yuliya Uladzimiraŭna Hatouka (born 24 April 2000) is a Belarusian professional tennis player.

Hatouka has career-high WTA rankings of 180 in singles and 384 in doubles. She has won ten singles titles and five doubles titles on the ITF Circuit.

Hatouka made her WTA Tour main-draw debut at the 2021 Internationaux de Strasbourg, where she passed qualifying.

Grand Slam singles performance timelines

ITF finals

Singles: 19 (10 titles, 9 runner–ups)

Doubles: 7 (5 titles, 2 runner–ups)

Notes

References

External links
 
 

2000 births
Living people
Belarusian female tennis players
21st-century Belarusian women